Full of Life is a 1956 American comedy-drama film directed by Richard Quine and starring Judy Holliday and Richard Conte. It was nominated for an award by the Writers Guild of America in 1957.

Plot
Writer Nick and his wife Emily are expecting their first child. When a necessary home repair proves too costly to afford, Nick must swallow his pride and visit his father, a proud immigrant stonemason with whom he has a difficult relationship, and ask him to do the work. Confronting the issues of religion and family tradition which have separated father and son causes Nick and Emily to reevaluate their lives and the things they value most.

Cast

See also
List of American films of 1956

References

External links
 
 
 
 

1956 films
Films directed by Richard Quine
Films based on works by John Fante
Films about writers
American black-and-white films
1950s English-language films
Films scored by George Duning
Films based on American novels
Columbia Pictures films
American comedy-drama films
1956 comedy-drama films